Bąk is a PKP railway station in Bąk (Pomeranian Voivodeship), Poland.

Lines crossing the station

References 

Railway stations in Pomeranian Voivodeship
Kościerzyna County